The Lithuanian language's declension system is similar to declension systems in ancient Indo-European languages such as Sanskrit, Latin or Ancient Greek. It is one of the most complicated declension systems among modern Indo-European and modern European languages.

Traditionally, scholars count up to ten case forms in Lithuanian. However, at least one case is reduced to adverbs and certain fixed expressions and another is extinct in the modern language. So the official variant of Lithuanian has eight cases; moreover, the illative case can be replaced with the locative case. The main cases are:
 nominative; used to identify the inflection type
 genitive; used to identify the inflection type
 dative
 accusative
 instrumental
 locative (inessive) and with several subcases:
 illative
allative (reduced to adverbs and certain fixed expressions)
 adessive †
 vocative

Lithuanian has two main grammatical numbers: singular and plural. There is also a dual number, which is used in certain dialects, such as Samogitian. Dual forms of pronouns used in the standard language are also optional. Although grammatically the dual number can be applied to any word, in practice it was used quite sporadically during the last century. The singular and the plural are used similarly to many European languages. Singular, plural and dual inflections of the same case always differ among themselves; no rule dictates how to form, for example, the plural inflection from the singular of the same case.

Nouns
Lithuanian nouns have five declensions which are defined by the inflection in singular nominative and genitive cases. Only a few borrowed words, like taksì – taxi, tabù – taboo, kupė̃ – compartment (in a train), coupé, are not subject to declension.

 There are only two nouns ending in -i:  'wife' and  'daughter-in-law'. Their declension is the same to the second adjective feminine declension and similar to a second feminine noun palatalized declension. The noun pati is the same to a pronoun  'herself; myself f; itself (for feminine nouns)'
 Exception: petys m – shoulder, peties, etc. after this declensional pattern. This declension is very similar to the fifth declension.
  'daughter' is the only word of the fifth declension not having the ending "uo". A word moteris 'woman, female' often has a genitive móters; the plural genitive of moteris is moterų (not palatalized -ių); it is the only normal form for the fifth declension and one of the two (the main is -ių) for the third. There was also possibly a word  – brother (modern ) in old Lithuanian.

Table of noun declension endings

 Nouns having -j- before an ending -as, vėjas – wind, vertėjas – translator (versti – translate; convert; subvert etc.), naudotojas – user (naudoti – to use), vartotojas – consumer (vartoti – to consume) have vocative -au: vėjau, vertėjau, naudotojau, vartotojau. Feminine counterparts for agent's words are vertėja, naudotoja, vartotoja and their vocative is the same to nominative. If naudotojas would have and ending -e for vocative it would sound same to feminine: naudotoja = *naudotoje (ja = *je, which is not used combination, because all vowels succeeding j are soft). Sg. locative of these words have -yje or -uje (-uje appears where it is needed for easier pronunciation): naudotojuje, vėjyje.
 There are only a few words with the ending -ias (sg. nom.), historically they are related with -ys words; -ias words have -y in vocative: svečias – svety (guest); kelias – kely (road); some can have fifth-declension-like ending -iau for vocative: velnias – velniau (devil). In dialects an inflection -iau in vocative can be used, for example, for names ending in -is: Algis – Algiau (dial.) instead of Algi. A word brolis besides a paradigmatic vocative broli has also a form brolaũ.
 Many nouns of this paradigm have -ų in pl. gen.: žąsis f – žąsų 'goose', naktis f – naktų 'night', debesis m – debesų 'cloud'.

Each Lithuanian consonant (except ) has two forms: palatalized and non-palatalized (-, -, - and so on).

The letter i represents either the sound similar to i in the English lit or is a palatalization marker – softens the preceding consonant (ia = like e, iu = ü, io = ö; all samples where i is a softening marker are ia (ią), iu (iū, ių), io). But  is a diphthong and there are no combinations ię and iė. Other diphthongs are: uo, ai, ei, oi (this one is used only in foreign words; in Lithuanian-derivation it is present when a word kojinė 'sock, stocking' is pronounced shorter as koinė), ui, au (palatalized iuo, iai, iui, iau; there is no iei combination because ei is already soft and same to iai; a combination  is only a diphthong and in use is succeeded by a consonant).

Feminine nouns ending in -a, and masculine ending in -us have their palatal forms: -ia, -ius (the latter is declined in the first paradigm in its plural). The nominative singular ending -ias (sg.  nom.; the first paradigm) alone is a palatal variant of -as, but -ias pattern, differently from -ia, -ius, are not palatalized counterpart for -as (unpalatalized equivalent in sg. nominative) and there is no palatalized counterpart for -as type. The -ias pattern is a type of -ys pattern, its words are declined like -ys words, except sg. nom. -ias and, for some of the words, vocative -iau. There are only a few words of -ias type.

There are two consonants in Lithuanian, d and t, that become respectively dž  and č  when they precede a palatalization marker i (so, this does not include the softer sounds: i, į, y, ė, e, ę) and they still have to be pronounced softer, like all other consonants preceding the palatalization marker. Examples: masc. sg. nom. svẽčias 'guest', fem. sg. nom. valdžià 'power (on somebody); government', m. sg. nom. skaĩčius 'number'; pavyzdỹs 'example', pãvyzdžio, pãvyzdžiui, pãvyzdį; kėdė̃ 'chair', kėdžių̃  etc. (Compare how T in English is pronounced like "sh" when followed by -ion in words like "station", "revolution", or how "due"/ "dew" and "Jew" are pronounced identically by many English speakers). 

I-st declension. Ending in -as (nom. sg.): rýtas – morning, var̃das – name. Ending in -is: brólis – brother, aũkštis – height. Ending in -ys: pavyzdỹs – example, dagỹs – thistle. Ending in -ias: kẽlias – road, élnias – deer. A word mė́nuo – month, moon, or mė́nesis, which uo ending form is of the V-th declension type, belongs to the first paradigm: nom. sg. mėnuo / mėnesis, gen. sg. mė́nesio etc.
II. Ending in -a: várna – crow, líepa – linden; July, gijà – thread, ply; palatalized: valià – will, galià – power, pradžià – beginning. Lithuanian vowel o  derives from an older ā : nom. sg. mótina (mother) < *mātina < *mātinā, gen. sg. mótinos < *mātinās. Ending in -ė: prẽkė – commodity, item, ẽglė – spruce.
III. Examples: pilìs f – castle, vagìs m – thief. There are many nouns of this paradigm which have -ų in pl. gen.: žąsìs f – žąsų̃ 'goose', naktìs f – naktų̃ 'night', debesìs m – debesų̃ 'cloud'. This declension is very similar to the fifth, except the singular nominative, genitive, instrumental and plural genitive for a part of nouns.
IV. Ending in -us: sūnùs – son, alùs – beer, rytojus – tomorrow; palatalized: karalius – king, procesorius – processor. The plural forms of the palatalized variant are of the first declension, the same to -is, -ys, -ias.
V. Nouns of this paradigm has a sg. nom. ending -uo and a suffix -en- in the other cases. Examples: vanduõ – water, akmuõ – stone. Words made with a suffix -m-: duomuõ 'a single item of a data' ← duoti 'to give', skaitmuõ 'digit' ← skaičiuoti 'to count, calculate'. There are two feminine nouns of the fifth declension, sesuõ – sister and duktė̃ – daughter, the second with an irregular ending. A word moteris – woman, having the same suffix as duktė and sesuo is declined in the third declension.

First declension

-as, -is, -ys (masculine)

Note that the -e ending for the vocative singular applies only to common nouns; proper nouns take the ending -ai. So, for example Jonas = 'John' [nominative] and Jonai! = 'John!' [vocative]

Second declension

-a, -ė, -ti (feminine)

Only two nouns end in -i: pati 'wife' and marti 'daughter-in-law'. Their declension is same to the second adjective feminine declension.

The noun pati has the same form as the pronoun pati 'herself; myself (feminine); itself (for feminine nouns)'.

Third declension

-is (masculine and feminine)

The only difference in masculine and feminine nouns of this declension is between the dative singular forms.

Fourth declension

-us, -ius (masculine)

The palatalized variant of this declension has the forms of the first declension.

Fifth declension

-uo (masculine)

There are also two feminine nouns of the fifth declension: sesuo (sister) and duktė (daughter).

Adjectives
In Lithuanian, adjectives have three declensions determined by the singular and plural nominative case inflections. Adjectives agree with nouns in number, gender, and case. Unlike nouns, which have two genders – masculine and feminine – adjectives have three (except -is, -ė adjectives), but the neuter adjectives (the third example in the table) have only one uninflected form.

Most of the first type adjectives of the third declension are with the suffix -in-. These are easily made from nouns, adjectives, by adding the suffix -in-. When made from verbs, they are mostly made from a past passive participle: vìrti – to boil, vìrtas – boiled, virtìnis – which is boiled, made by boiling. Consequently, the suffix is -t-in- for such adjectives. These variants of verbal derivation easily become nouns, in this case it is a noun virtìnis – dumpling (with mushrooms; curd; etc.; but dumplings with meat are called koldūnai). There are also some other word types having certain suffixes or prefixes in this declensional group: (of the first accentuation pattern) pern-ykšt-is – of yesteryear (pernai - in yesteryear); apy-geris – goodish, around good; po-geris – around good; prie-kurtis – somewhat deaf; (of the second accentuation pattern) ketvirt-ain-is, viln-on-is – woollen, graž-ut-ėl-is, rug-ien-is, maž-yl-is – tiny tot, ger-ul-is – goody, maž-ut-is – smally.
Two adjectives of the third declension have long -ys: dešinỹs – right, kairỹs – left; plural nominative is dešinì, kairì; plural dative: dešiníems, kairíems. A short form of dìdelis, dìdelė is dìdis, didì (similar to pats, pati). Dešinys, kairys, didis have neutral gender of the u pattern: dešinu, kairu, didu. Pronominal forms: didỹsis, didžióji, dešinỹsis, dešinióji. An adjective didelis, didelė hasn't pronominal forms. The word didis has more mingled forms: nominative is sometimes didus; genitive masc.: didžio / didaus; accusative: didį (/ didų); plural masc. nom. didūs; other forms are of the regular pattern.
Adjectives, except -inis type and an adjective didelis, can have pronominal (definite) forms
Some other forms have variations in the standard language: pė́sčias, pėsčià, pė́sčia – pedestrian, afoot; pėsčiàsis, pėsčióji and pėstỹsis, pėsčióji (adjectival and substantival meanings).

Table of adjective declension endings

Masculine adjectives of the III-rd paradigm are of two types, they differ in plural nominative and dative: varinis – copper, brazen, laukinis – wild have pl. nom. variniai, laukiniai and pl. dat. variniams, laukiniams; an example of the second type: didelis (big), dideli in pl. nom. and dideliems in pl. dat.

Pronominal forms

Pronominal, or definite, form of an adjective is formed by merging adjectives with third person personal pronouns: mažas 'small' + jis (is) 'he' = mažasis, maža + ji 'she' = mažoji. An example: mažasis princas 'the little prince' (the name of the novella is Mažasis princas – The Little Prince). And a normal form: mažas princas 'a little prince'.

Several forms have not only a pronoun added, but have different respective to non-pronominal adjectives ending syllable – longer sound retained: feminine singular nominative -o-ji, masculine singular instrumental and plural accusative, respectively -uo-ju, -uos-ius (the respective forms of a pronoun jis are juo, juos) and one with ogonek, feminine singular instrumental: -ą-ja, -ią-ja; or has a sound -m- not doubled: masculine singular dative and locative, masculine plural dative, feminine plural dative and instrumental, for example -a-jam, -a-jame, -ies-iems, not non-existing -am-jam, -ame-jame, -iems-iems.

Examples

Pronouns
The personal pronouns aš (I), tu (you) jis (he, it), ji (she, it) and the reflexive pronoun savęs are declined as follows:

Note that the table contains only the objective genitive of pronouns aš, tu, savęs. The possessive genitives of these words are mano, tavo and savo respectively. Compare jis manęs laukia – 'he waits for me' and  mano draugas – 'my friend' ('friend' is in masculine), but in jis mūsų laukia – 'he waits for us' and mūsų draugas – 'our friend', the two genitives coincide as in almost any word.

Irregular declension
Duktė – daughter, and sesuo – sister, are the only two feminine words of the fifth declension, they have the suffix -er- in the other cases. One word, moteris – woman, female, is both of the fifth and the third declensions, because it has variant genitive singular, both variants of which (-s and -ies) are equally apt, and it has a gen. pl. -ų. Two more words, dieveris m (older) – brother-in-law, and obelis f – apple tree, are the same case as moteris. The word dieveris, -ies (-ers) m, having more close meaning to a proper one, possibly has the fifth-type-like masculine singular instrumental (dieveriu), which is taken from the first declension, while the words of the third declension have -imi (dantimi, vagimi), without a gender distinction. But -imi is normal as well for the masculine nouns of the fifth declension, for example – akmenimi / akmeniu.

A word šuo – dog, differs from the other -uo words in that, that its stem is mixed with the suffix -uo and it consequently does not have the suffix -en- in the other cases (š-uo, akm-uo; šu-n-į, akm-en-į), its singular instrumental normal ending is of the third type (šunimi; that can be understood as a part of a meaning: more like an indefinite gender) and its accentuation paradigm is fourth, the sole case for the -uo words.

Mėnuo – month, moon, is of the first declension -is type, the only fifth type form is one of the two equal variants of singular nominative: mėnuo (other is mėnesis); genitive is mėnesio etc.

The word žmogus – man, human, historically had the nominative singular žmuo (compare Latin homō). Today žmogus is declined in the fourth paradigm in singular (žmogus, žmogaus etc.) and in the third -ė paradigm in plural (žmonės, žmonių etc.).

The words pats m, pati f – one/my/him/her/itself (also noun meanings: husband and wife) have also peculiarities. The ending -i (f., sg. nom.) is present only in two words: pati and marti – daughter-in-law. Pats (< patis) is of the third adjectival declensional type, but the singular nominative is different (-s < -is), plural nominative is -ys and the singular genitive -ies, like in nouns of the third declension. Its sg. gen. is also often said pačio.

The words of the third declension (-is, -ies) have either -ių or -ų in the genitive plural. The dative singular, similarly to the fifth declensional type, differs depending on the gender (-iai f, -iui m), the instrumental singular, differently from the fifth type, is the same for both genders. One noun of the third type, petys, peties, has the sg. nom. ending with a long i: -ys. Some of the words having the suffix -uonis (there are few of such words) have parallel forms in the other declensions: palikuonis, -ies (common gender) and palikuonis, -io m, palikuonė, -ės f. Such change can happen after the change of an accent place: if the word is accented on the ending -is, then the change of declension (-is, -ies > -is, -io) does not occur in speech, and if the accent moves from the ending to the stem in singular nominative, then the change of declension sometimes occurs. For most of -uonis words, declining in the first declension is considered to be a mistake.

Shifts in declension
There are few words which are sometimes declined mistakenly in other declensions. But some of the shifts are not rare: a word pats besides sg. gen. paties is often said pačio and these two forms of sg. gen. are equal. Some words have parallel forms from other declensions with a little change in a meaning: dukra, dukros; sesė, sesės; palikuonis, -io, palikuonė, -ės. The forms sesė and dukra are more like unformal, than duktė, -ers and sesuo, -ers. For the word moteris the form motera were existent in dialects, but it is, differently from dukra, sesė cases, only a formal shift of declension without a meaning variation and such word would be perceived as a vernacularism and obsolete.

The forms from the two more declensions sometimes occur in a speech for the masculine words of the fifth declension: of the third and of the first declensions. Similar case is with the masculine words of the third declension – they are sometimes declined in the first declension (because singular nominative is the same). Such a shift is a mistake of declension. For example, a word akmuo, akmens can have the forms (third d.) (sg. nom., sg. gen.) akmenis, akmenies – more like older dialectal not used widely and a little likely to be heard in a speech – and (first d.) akmenis, akmenio; akmenys, akmenio; akmenas, akmeno – sometimes said by the speakers, who don't know the fifth declension well, for example, children. But these variants are possibly also present as dialectal forms. The other examples which are sometimes used by some, but not fit are: rudenio (rudens), šunio (šuns, šunies) etc. Examples of migrants from the third declension (-is, -ies) are, for example, dantis, dančio instead of dantis, danties. Such use like akmenas, akmeno; dančio; šunio; rudenio; is a clear mistake and is not accepted. A case of petys, pečio instead of petys, peties is also a mistake, but petys is the only one -ys (instead of -is) form declined in the third declension and consequentely tends to be declined like all other -ys words (of the first declension).

For the word mėnuo / mėnesis the proper form is sg. gen. mėnesio etc. (sg. gen. mėnesies is known in dialects). The genitive of the word pats is paties, but it is also frequently said pačio. Some of the cases of the word pats are of the third adjectival declension, some – sg. nom. -s (< -is), sg. gen. -ies (also -io, like in respective adjectives) and pl. nom. -ys – of the third noun declension.

Some of the nouns occur in another declensional type only in one case. All these cases are more like dialectal and older. For example, seseris can be said seseria in dialects, but the genitive remains sesers; (older) motė, moters, but also a migrant form: (older) motė, motės. The dialectal and older form sesuva (a type of sesuo), for example, can remain in the original paradigm with sg. gen. sesers or shift to the -a declension: sesuva, sesuvos.

Tables
In the tables below the words from the fifth and the third declensions are compared with the words from the other declensions. Table cells with the correct forms written are coloured (not white). In the right outside column the variant forms within the fifth and third declensions are given. They are older, dialectal and not used or used only in small areas. For example, among the variant forms of singular nominative sesuo within the fifth declension are archaic sesuoj, sesuon, sesuva. The first column is for the words of the fifth (-uo, -ens / -ers) declension and the second for the third (-is, -ies). These declensions are very similar. The words are given in the same column, when the forms are same. The column to the right from these, are for the forms of the first (-as, -is, -ys, -ias) and second (-a (-ia), -ė) declensions; one word, žmogus, is of the fourth in singular.

The proper forms of the word mėnuo / mėnesis is not of the fifth-third declension and the same is with the word žmogus, which historically had the form žmuo. A word judesys – move, is included for comparison with mėnesis (they have the same suffix -es- and are declined in the same declension, except sg. nom. of mėnuo / mėnesis).

Dukra and sesė are variants of duktė, sesuo of a different declension and meaning – dukra and sesė are more like informal.

A word palikuonis has two forms of different declensions: one of the third (original) – palikuonis, and other shifted to the first declension – palikuonis, -io palikuonė, -ės. There are few of -uonis words and only several of them have forms other than the original declension, but in a speech some of them are also sometimes declined in the first declension, for example, geluonis, -ies c – sting, can be understood as geluonis, -io m.

For the -uo words (except mėnuo) and the -is words (like dantis) the shift to the other declensions would be a mistake. When the shift is from the fifth to the third declension it can be understood as minor variation, but the shift to the first declension would be a clear mistake (however, some of the cases are the same, and that is one of the reasons why the shift can occur). But in speech some of the speakers say, for example, rudenio instead of rudens (this can come on dialectal base), dantis, dančio instead of dantis, danties. Besides these cases, there are shifts, which occur commonly in a speech: pačio instead of paties, pečio instead of peties (the original variants are not used less). A word šuo can also be said šuva (one of dialectal variants).

The words rūgštìs f 3 (1) – acid, and rū̃gštis 2 – sourness; acidity, are two words of different declensions, their meanings are different, but related.

Declension by the paradigms

a-paradigm 

The a-paradigm is used to decline:
 nouns of the first declension
 adjectives of the first declension (masculine forms)
 adjectives of the third declension (masculine forms, palatalized sub-paradigm)
 all pronouns (masculine forms), except the pronoun pats – 'own, self'
 all passive (the main sub-paradigm) or active (the palatalized sub-paradigm) participles (masculine, - active participles have their specific nominatives)
 all ordinal numbers (masculine forms, adjective inflections)
 significant part of cardinal numbers (masculine, see the list below)

The a-paradigm is the most complex declension paradigm in Lithuanian. It has two different sub-paradigms, one of which is the main paradigm. The second sub-paradigm is called "palatalized", which means that the last consonant of the stem before the inflection is always palatalized. Note that in this case the palatalization mark (the letter "i") is marked as a part of the inflection. The a-paradigm is masculine.

Also note that inflection in the a-paradigm is different for nouns, adjectives, and pronouns in some cases. However, not every pronoun's declension uses the inflections from the "pronoun" column in the table below. Some pronouns, as well as every numeral of the a-paradigm, use the inflections from the "adjective" column.

The main sub-paradigm

 Tas - 'that', rudas - 'brown', namas - 'house'.

Other features:
 the -e ending for the vocative singular applies only to common nouns; proper nouns take the ending -ai. So, for example Jonas = John [nominative] and Jonai! = John! [vocative])

The palatalized sub-paradigm

 Šis - 'this', žalias - 'green', uosis - 'ash' (a tree).

Other features:
 The inflection of noun for singular nominative can be -is, -ys or -ias, depending on word. Pronouns however always have the inflection -is, but adjectives never have -ys in this case.
 The inflection in singular accusative depends on the inflection in singular nominative. If the singular nominative ends with -ias, a word has -ią in singular accusative, otherwise it has the inflection -į.
 Significant part of adjectives, that end with -is in the singular nominative (adjectives of the third declension), have noun inflections in plural.
 The inflection in singular vocative follows the inflection of the singular nominative too:

Pronouns
 Part of pronouns (kas - 'who, what', kažkas - 'somebody, something', tas - 'that', šitas - 'this' etc.) use the main sub-paradigm, but others (jis - 'he', šis - 'this', kuris- 'which' etc.) the palatalized.
 Pronouns koks - 'what' (quality), kažkoks - 'somewhat', toks - 'such', šitoks - 'such'(demonstrative), kitoks - 'different, other' have the inflection -s instead of the regular -is in the singular nominative.
 Pronoun kitas - 'another, other' is declined using adjectival inflections.
 There are few pronouns, that don't use  the a-paradigm:
 Personal pronouns aš - 'I', tu - 'you, thou', mes - 'we', jūs - 'you' (plural), that formally are of the indefinite gender, each has its own specific paradigm.
 Pronoun pats - 'own, self' uses the i-paradigm.
 Note, that pronouns kas - 'who, what' or kažkas - 'somebody, something', that have the indefinite gender only, do use the a-paradigm.

Numbers
 The a-paradigm (the main sub-paradigm) is used with all ordinal  numbers in masculine and with all collective numbers.
 The a-paradigm (the palatalized sub-paradigm) is used with all numbers-for-plural-only in masculine.
 Cardinal numbers that use the adjectival a-paradigm (the palatalized sub-paradigm) in plural (as they're plural only) are:

keturi - 'four'
penki - 'five'
šeši - 'six'
septyni - 'seven'
aštuoni - 'eight'
devyni - 'nine'

 Cardinal numbers that use inflections of nouns of the a-paradigm both in singular and in plural are:

šimtas - 'a hundred'
tūkstantis - 'a thousand'
milijonas - 'a million'
milijardas - 'a billion'
...
and other internationally accepted words for big numbers.

 Some cardinal numbers have their own specific paradigms:
 a number du - 'two' uses a paradigm of the dual number.
 a number trys - 'three' uses a specific paradigm, similar to the i-paradigm.
 a number dešimt - 'ten' is undeclinable  (however it's a shortened word from dešimtis - 'ten', which is of the i-paradigm).

List of numbers, that don't use the a-paradigm

Here is a list of numerals that don't use the a-paradigm in the masculine. See the o-paradigm for feminine numbers.

du - 'two' (dual number, has a special paradigm)
trys - 'three' (the i-paradigm)
vienuolika - '11'
dvylika - '12'
trylika - '13'
keturiolika - '14'
penkiolika - '15'
šešiolika - '16'
septyniolika - '17'
aštuoniolika - '18'
devyniolika - '19' (numbers 'vienuolika' - 'devyniolika' are singular words of the o-paradigm)
dešimt - 'ten' (undeclinable, sometimes "dešimtis" as a word of the i-paradigm)

Nominatives of the active participles

Notes:
 Short forms of the nominatives skip the active participle suffix -(i)ant-,  e. g.  miegantis 'sleeping' (masculine singular, the long form) -  miegąs  (idem, the short form),  sakantys 'saying' (masculine plural, the long form) - saką  (idem, the short form).  This is valid in the masculine nominative only.
 The past tense doesn't have the long forms.

u-paradigm 

The u-paradigm is used to decline:
 nouns of the fourth declension
 adjectives of the second declension (their masculine forms)

The u-paradigm has two different sub-paradigms, the main and the palatalized. Note, that in this case the palatalization mark (the letter "i") is marked as a part of the inflection. The u-paradigm is masculine.

Inflections of the u-paradigm differ between nouns and adjectives in some cases.

The main sub-paradigm

 Drąsus - 'brave', sūnus - 'son'.

The palatalized sub-paradigm

 Narsus - 'brave, hardy', karalius - 'king'.

Note that:
 The sub-paradigm for adjectives is fully identical with the main sub-paradigm and is mixed-type, with some inflections palatalized and others not.
 The plural of nouns in this sub-paradigm is identical with the plural of nouns of the a-paradigm (the palatalized sub-paradigm).

o-paradigm 

The o-paradigm is used to decline:
 part of nouns of the second declension (whose singular nominative ends with -a or -i)
 adjectives of the first declension (their feminine forms)
 adjectives of the second declension (their feminine forms, the palatalized sub-paradigm)
 all pronouns (their feminine forms)
 all passive (the main sub-paradigm) or active (the palatalized sub-paradigm) participles (feminine)
 all ordinal numbers (feminine forms, the main sub-paradigm)
 cardinal numbers from vienuolika - 'eleven', dvylika - 'twelve' to devyniolika - 'nineteen' (in singular)
 (feminine) cardinal numbers, that are used in plural, except a number trys - 'three'.

The main sub-paradigm 

 Ta - 'that', ruda - 'brown', meška - 'bear'.

The palatalized sub-paradigm 

 Ši - 'this', stipri - 'strong, potent', galia - 'power'.

Other features:
 Words of the palatalized sub-paradigm may have -i or -ia in the singular nominative. This doesn't affect other inflections.
 Adjectives of the first declension have -ia, but adjectives of the second declension have -i in the singular nominative.

Pronouns
 Part of pronouns (ta - 'that', šita - 'this' etc.) use the main sub-paradigm, but others (ji - 'he', ši - 'this', kuri- 'which' etc.) the palatalized.
 There are few pronouns, that don't use  the o-paradigm:
 Personal pronouns aš - 'I', tu - 'you, thou', mes - 'we', jūs - 'you' (plural), that are of the indefinite gender, each has its own specific paradigm.
 Pronouns kas - 'who, what' or kažkas - 'somebody, something', that have the indefinite gender only, use the a-paradigm.

Numbers
 The i-paradigm (the main sub-paradigm) is used with all ordinal  numbers in feminine.
 The a-paradigm (the palatalized sub-paradigm) is used with all numbers-for-plural-only in feminine.
 Cardinal numbers, that use the o-paradigm (the palatalized sub-paradigm) in feminine plural (as they're plural only) are:

keturios - 'four'
penkios - 'five'
šešios - 'six'
septynios - 'seven'
aštuonios - 'eight'
devynios - 'nine'

 Cardinal numbers, that use the o-paradigm (the palatalized sub-paradigm) in feminine singular are:

vienuolika - '11'
dvylika - '12'
trylika - '13'
keturiolika - '14'
penkiolika - '15'
šešiolika - '16'
septyniolika - '17'
aštuoniolika - '18'
devyniolika - '19'

 Numbers vienuolika to devyniolika have the inflexion -a instead of -ą in the (singular) accusative.
 Some cardinal numbers have their specific paradigms:
 a number dvi - 'two' (feminine) uses a paradigm of the dual number.
 a number trys - 'three' uses a specific paradigm, similar to the i-paradigm.

ė-paradigm 

The ė-paradigm is used to decline:
 part of nouns of the second declension (that end with -ė in the singular nominative)
 adjectives of the third declension (their feminine forms)

The words in the table:
 Didelė - 'big', upė - 'river'.

Note, that the inflection of the plural genitive is palatalized (-ių).

i-paradigm 

The i-paradigm is used to decline:
 nouns of the third declension, which are mostly feminine (dantis - 'tooth', debesis - 'cloud', vagis - thief and few nouns that end with -uonis in the singular nominative are masculine exceptions)
 nouns of the fifth declension, which are mostly masculine (duktė - 'daughter', sesuo - 'sister' are feminine exceptions)
 pronoun pats - 'own, self' (masculine form)
 number trys - 'three' (has the plural only)

All these words use the unsuffixed sub-paradigm, except the nouns of the first declension, which apply the suffixed sub-paradigm

Unsuffixed sub-paradigm 

The words in the table:
 pilis - 'castle', vagis - 'thief'.

Other features:
Many words have -ų instead of -ių in the plural genitive, for example, žąsis - žąsų 'goose', naktis-naktų 'night', debesis - debesų 'cloud'.

Irregularities:
Words pats - 'own, self' and trys - 'three' are declined as following:

Note, that the word pats is declined only in masculine in this table. Its feminine form pati is declined with the o-paradigm regularly.

Suffixed sub-paradigm 

The words in the table:
 akmuo - 'stone', sesuo - 'sister'.

Other features:
 Other cases than the singular nominative always have a suffix -en- for masculine words and -er- for feminine words. There are only two feminine words using the suffixed subparadigm, duktė - 'daughter' and  sesuo - 'sister'.

Irregularities:
 A word duktė - 'daughter' has the inflexion -ė instead of -uo in singular nominative.
 A word šuo - 'dog' has a suffix -un- instead of -en-. The root of this word formally is a single š-, but historically it was šu-, that subsequently amalgamated with the suffix, and the further cases are šuns, šuniui, šunį and so on.

Other:
 A word sesuo - 'sister' has a synonym sesė, that's used in vocative ('sese!') more often than the first ('seserie!'). The synonym sesė is of the ė-paradigm.

Dual number

The dual number has its specific inflections, that are similar with plural inflections with some specific differences:
Nominative, accusative or vocative: masculine words end with -(i)u, feminine with -i
Genitive and locatives are the same as in the plural.
Dative has the inflection of the plural dative, but without the final -s, so -(i)ams, -iems, -(i)oms, -ėms, -ims in the plural give -(i)am, -iem, -(i)om, -ėm, -im in the   dual respectively
Instrumental has the same inflections as the dual dative, but they are pronounced in different intonation.

Other features:
 It depends on the paradigm, whether -(i) in the brackets is used or not. The masculine i-paradigm always has -iu as the nominative  inflection.
Irregularities:
 A word du - 'two' has three modifications of the stem, d- (in nominative and accusative), dv- (in dative and instrumental) and dviej- (in genitive and locatives)
 Words mudu - 'we (both)', judu - 'you (both)', juodu - 'they (both)' (masculine), jiedvi - 'they (both)' (feminine), as well as šiuodu - 'these (both)', tuodu - 'that (both)', abudu - 'both' and their feminine counterparts have a specific paradigm, based on declension of a word du - 'two' (see an example in the paragraph about pronouns).

Shortened inflections 

Inflections, that have two or more syllables, are often shortened in Lithuanian, eliding the final short vowel. Shortened inflections are especially used in the spoken language, while in the written language full inflections are preferred. The elision occur in:
 Singular locative. Inflections -ame, -yje, -oje, -ėje may be shortened to  -am, -y(j), -oj, -ėj. Note, that a one-syllable inflection -e of the a-paradigm isn't a subject of the rule.
 Plural instrumental. Feminine inflections -omis, -ėmis, -imis may be shortened to  -om, -ėm, -im. These inflections coincide with respective inflections of the dual number.
 Plural dative has  one-syllable inflections, but sometimes they are shortened, skipping the final -s, to -am, -iem, -om, -ėm, -im. These inflections coincide with respective inflections of the dual number too.
 Plural locative. A masculine inflections -uose may be shortened to -uos. What however doesn't pertain to  inflections -yse, -ose, -ėse,  whose shortened variants would  coincide with inflections of other cases.

Also there's just one occasion, when the whole one-syllable inflection may be skipped. This may be done with feminine active participles of the past tense (or of the past iterative tense) in the singular nominative. So a word dariusi - 'who was making, who has made' can be said as darius. Note, that this shortened form coincides with the sub-participle of the past tense.

History

Noun declension inter-linguistic comparison
The declension of Lithuanian nouns of the different declensional patterns are given compared with Latin, Sanskrit, Latvian (in a separate section), Old Prussian, Gothic, Ancient Greek and Russian. Because Old Prussian has left a limited literature with not all the cases of all the stems employed, the Prussian samples are not full in the tables (the cases which existed are most probably already reconstructed from various data by linguists). At the same time there were fewer cases in Prussian than in modern common Lithuanian and mixing the declension patterns was more common, what could develop in a context of a slow decline in the use of Old Prussian, as the Prussians adopted the languages of the others, particularly German. Lithuanian declension varied in dialects.

The first declension. Sg. nom. ends in -as, sg. acc. – in -ą. Latin words of this stem ends in -us in sg. nom., and -um in sg. acc. When these Latin endings succeeded a labial sound, their vowel was originally ŏ: equos – horse, equom; servos – slave, serf, servom. Sg. nom. in Prussian and Gothic is shortened: tavs, dags. Such shortening is present in western and northern Lithuanian dialects: tėvas, -o – father, and tėvs, -o; dagas, -o – heat of the sun (from degti – to burn), and dags, -o. In Prussian there existed only a shortened form, and it developed one step further in a part of the nouns: kaimis / kaimⁱs – village < kaims < kaimas (Lith. kaimas – village, kiemas – yard). There are no neuter nouns in Lithuanian and Latvian, differently from the other given here: Lith. butas – flat, living place, Prus. butan – the same meaning, Lat. aedificium – building. Lithuanian instrumental -u derives from an older -uo, what is seen, for example, in pronominal (definite) adjective forms, pronouns: gerù (nom. sg. gẽras – good) and gerúo-ju (nom. sg. geràsis – that good one), juõ (nom. sg. jis / is – he). Lithuanian diphthong uo corresponds to Latin ō. For dat. sg., an ending -uo is also known in dialects. Lithuanian acc. sg. and gen. pl. are written in the letters with an ogonek: ą and ų. An ogonek indicates that the sound is long. Historically these sounds were nasal: vilką < vilkan, vilkų < vilkun. The form with a sound -n is used in some places in north-west Samogitia today. Latin pl. dat.-abl. -īs corresponds to Ancient Greek pl. dat. -ois and Lithuanian pl. instr. -ais. Lithuanian sg. gen. corresponds to Slavic, for example, Russian: vilko (also dial. vilkā) and Russian во́лка. Prussian sg. loc. was probably -ai, -ei: bītai (adverb) – in the evening, kvei – where; compare Lith. namiẽ – at home (namè – in the house).

The second declension. Lithuanian and Prussian o denotes a long ō. Narrowed more, it becomes ū. When more open, it is ā; ā was used in Catechisms in Prussian, o – in Elbing vocabulary. The ą, ę correspond to ų, į in dialects of eastern Lithuania and acc. sg. is kalbų (kalbą), gėlį (gėlę) in these dialects. The case of -ų corresponds to Latvian and Slavic languages: nom. sg. liepa (Lith.) – linden, liepa (Latv.), ли́па / lipa (Rus.) and acc. sg. liepą and liepų (Lith.), liepu (Latv.), ли́пу / lipu (Rus.).

Fifth declension. Among variant declensional forms are known: sg. dat. -i, -: akmeni, akmenie, seseri, seserie. Sg. gen. akmenes, pl. nom. akmenes, akmens. In a case of Old Prussian emen – name, e is dropped in other than sg. nom. cases (sg. acc. emnin instead of emenin). A drop can similarly occur in other languages, for example: Lith. vanduo – water, sg. gen. variants: vandens, vandenies, vandinies, vandenio, vandinio, vandnio. Gothic wato n – water: pl. forms, for example, nom.-acc. watna.

The third declension.

The fourth declension. Prussian sg. nom. -us is known from Elbing vocabulary, it was shortened to -s in Catechisms. Sg. gen. -us is an innovative form, known from Catechisms, the older form was -aus. A word сынъ is given in Old Slavonic cases.

The second declension, -ė type. Prussian -ē stems became -i in an unaccented position.

Lithuanian and Latvian
Lithuanian declensional endings are given compared with Latvian declensional endings in the table below.

References

 J. Marvan. Modern Lithuanian declension: a study of its infrastructure. University of Michigan. 1979
 Lituanus. Lithuanian in the 21st century. Retrieved 2007.04.28
  I. Savickienė, A. Kazlauskienė, L. Kamandulytė.  Naujas požiūris į lietuvių kalbos daiktavardžio linksniavimo tipus pagal natūraliosios morfologijos teoriją. Retrieved 2007.04.28

See also

Lithuanian grammar
Declension